BackCare is a British medical research charity organization providing services for the management of back problems. The organization was established in 1968 as the National Back Pain Association. BackCare is a registered charity (number 256751) that aims to reduce the burden of back pain by providing information and support, promoting good practice and funding research on the subject. 
BackCare acts as the hub between patients, (healthcare) professionals, employers, policymakers, researchers, and all others with an interest in back pain.

BackCare was founded in 1968 by Stanley Grundy, CBE (Commander of the Order of the British Empire, an honorary award), who suffered from chronic back pain. At that time, there was a lack of information or extensive research in this area. He founded the Back Pain Research Association, which was later renamed the National Back Pain Association (NBPA) and is now known as BackCare.

BackCare released an iPhone app in 2010, which runs on the iPhone, iPod Touch and iPad. It was featured in The Sunday Times' Top 500 Apps on 20 February 2011 and won the 'Best Use of Technology' Award at the Charity Times Awards 2011.

References

External links
 

Health charities in the United Kingdom